Fender tweed is a generic name used for the guitar amplifiers made by the American company Fender between 1948 and 1960. The amplifiers are named for the cloth covering, which consists of varnished cotton twill, incorrectly called tweed because of its feel and appearance. They are praised for their sound, their circuitry considered "hallowed ground". Fender generally stopped using the twill covering in 1960, though the Harvard was still covered in twill until 1963, and the Champ until 1964.

In 1953, Fender introduced the "wide panel" construction, where the top and bottom panels are wider than the side panels. In the later "narrow panels", introduced in 1955, all panels have approximately the same size. Later amplifiers used tolex for the covering.

Beginning in 1990, Fender began to utilize the tweed covering once again, starting with the '59 Bassman Reissue. Some later amplifier models came in the split option of tweed or black tolex covering, including the Blues Junior and Pro Junior. The Fender Blues Deluxe and Blues DeVille and their later reissues were also available in tweed, as well as the Custom Shop reissues of several of the Tweed Era amplifiers.

In 2012, Fender introduced its first "Signature series"; Eric Clapton helped design the "EC" series of three amplifiers, including the Vibro-Champ, based on the five-watt amplifier "allegedly" used for the recording of Layla and Other Assorted Love Songs.

Tweed amplifiers
Fender Bandmaster
Fender Bassman
Fender Blues Deluxe Reissue
Fender Champ
Fender Harvard
Fender Princeton
Fender Pro
Fender Super
Fender Tremolux
Fender Tweed Deluxe
Fender Twin
Fender Vibrolux

References

Fender amplifiers